Kitāb al-Rawḍ al-miʿṭār fi khabar al-aqṭār (The Book of the Fragrant Garden) is a fourteenth-century Arabic geography by al-Ḥimyarī that is a primary source for the history of Muslim Iberia in the Middle Ages, though it is based in part on the earlier account by Muhammad al-Idrisi. Very little is known about the author, except that he was close to the Hafsid dynasty. It was edited and translated into French by Évariste Lévi-Provençal in 1938 and into Spanish by María Pilar Maestro González in 1963.

Notes

Geographical works of the medieval Islamic world
15th-century Arabic books